Tanya Smith may refer to:

 Tanya Smith (basketball) (born 1984), Australian basketball player
 Tanya M. Smith, evolutionary biologist